CatDV is an asset manager program for handling multimedia production workflows developed by Square Box Systems. Quantum Corporation acquired Square Box Systems in 2020.

Versions

The full family of CatDV Products is as follows:

CatDV Standalone Products

	CatDV Professional Edition
	CatDV Pegasus

CatDV Networked Products
	CatDV Essential - entry level server product
	CatDV Enterprise Server - for MySQL databases and most common server platforms including Linux, Windows and Mac OS X
	CatDV Pegasus Server - adds features such as high performance full-text indexing, access control lists, and more
	CatDV Worker Node - automated workflow and transcoding engine
	CatDV Web Client - provides access to the CatDV database via a web browser. There is no need to install special software on the desktop, making it easy to deploy to a large number of users.
	CatDV Professional Edition & Pegasus Clients - designed to support the multi-user capabilities of the CatDV Enterprise and Workgroup Servers from the desktop

Awards
CatDV won two awards in 2010, a blue ribbon from  Creative COW Magazine and a "Best of Show Vidy Award" from Videography. 

In April 2012 Square Box won a Queen's Award for Enterprise for CatDV.

References

External links
 Square Box Systems Ltd. official site

Information technology management
Video editing software